The Price of Success may refer to:

 The Price of Success (1925 film)
 The Price of Success (2017 film)